Pedostrangalia is a genus of beetles which belong to the subfamily Lepturinae in the family of longhorn beetles.

Appearance

Medium-sized, slim, brown-red to black longhorn beetles. In all cases, some individuals have red wing-coverings, and some have black. The antennae are thin, and about the same length as the body. The pronotum is bell-shaped, with wings tapering backwards. The legs are medium-sized, and thin.

Life 

The larvae develop in rotten, often dead, wood which is contact with living wood, often of different type of trees. Development usually takes two to three years. Adult beetles are most active in mid-summer, and visit a variety of flowers, particularly Apiaceae and other plants with white, open flowers. This is not true of all species. Lepturinae are lively insects compared to other longhorn beetles which are quite slow.

Habitat 

The insects are found across most of Europe and Asia.

Species 
Subgenus Neosphenalia Löbl, 2010
 Pedostrangalia adaliae (Reitter, 1885)
 Pedostrangalia ariadne Daniel K., 1904
 Pedostrangalia emmipoda (Mulsant, 1863)
 Pedostrangalia femoralis (Motschulsky, 1860)
 Pedostrangalia kurda Sama, 1996
 Pedostrangalia raggii Sama, 1992
 Pedostrangalia riccardoi Holzschuh, 1984
 Pedostrangalia verticalis (Germar 1822)
 Pedostrangalia verticenigra (Pic, 1892)
Subgenus Pedostrangalia (sensu stricto)
 Pedostrangalia afghanistana Satô & Ohbayashi, 1976
 Pedostrangalia imberbis (Ménétriés, 1832)
 Pedostrangalia muneaka (Mitono & Tamanuki, 1939)
 Pedostrangalia nobilis Holzschuh, 2008
 Pedostrangalia quadrimaculata Chen & Chiang, 1996
 Pedostrangalia revestita (Linnaeus, 1767)
 Pedostrangalia rubricosa Holzschuh, 2008
 Pedostrangalia signifera Holzschuh, 1999
 Pedostrangalia tokatensis Sama, 1996
 Pedostrangalia tricolorata Holzschuh, 1991
 Pedostrangalia ulmi Holzschuh, 1982

References

External links 

Cerambycidae of the World – Lepturini 
 Nettside om Pedostrangalia revestita

 Image gallery

Lepturinae
Beetles described in 1896